Pacho Alonso (August 22, 1928 – August 27, 1982) was a Cuban singer and bandleader from Santiago de Cuba who is attributed with creating the musical form pilón in collaboration with percussionist/composer Enrique Bonne. He founded his first conjunto in Havana in 1957. In the 1950s, Alonso sang with Benny Moré and Fernando Álvarez, a trio popularly known as  "The Three Musketeers". Later he sang with Ibrahim Ferrer. Pacho Alonso also enjoyed tremendous success in his international tours through Latin America, Europe and Africa.

References

1928 births
1982 deaths
20th-century Cuban male singers
Cuban bandleaders
People from Santiago de Cuba
People from Havana